This is a list of universities in Nigeria. Nigeria is organised into 36 states and the Federal Capital Territory. As a result of the oil boom years of the 1970s, tertiary level of education was expanded to reach every sub-region of Nigeria. The federal and state governments were previously the only bodies licensed to operate universities. Recently, licenses have been granted to individuals, corporate bodies and religious bodies to establish private universities in the country.

The National Universities Commission (NAC) is the major accreditation and regulatory body that enforces uniform standard and sets admissions capacity of every Nigerian university.

Institutions

 Abubakar Tatari Ali Polytechnic, Bauchi
Ahman Pategi University, Patigi, Kwara State
Anchor University, Ayobo, Lagos
 Bauchi State University, Gadau, Bauchi State
Bayelsa Medical University (BMU), Yenagoa, Bayelsa State
Borno State University, Maiduguri, Borno State 
Edusoko University, Bida, Niger State
 Ekiti State University, Ado Ekiti
 Federal University, Birnin Kebbi, Kebbi State
 Federal University Gashua, Yobe State
 Federal University Dutse (FUD)
 Federal University of Petroleum Resource Effurun
 Federal University of Technology Minna
 Gombe State University, Gombe
 Gombe State University of Science and Technology, Kumo
 Ibrahim Badamasi Babangida University, Lapai
 Ignatius Ajuru University of Education (formerly Rivers State College of Education), Port Harcourt
 Imo State University, Owerri
 Institute of Management and Technology, Enugu
 Kaduna State University, Kaduna, Kaduna State
 Kano State University of Technology, Wudil
 Kebbi State University of Science and Technology, Aliero, Kebbi State
 Kogi State University, Ayigba, Kogi State
 Kwara State University, Malete, Kwara State
 Ladoke Akintola University of Technology, Ogbomoso
 Lagos Business School, Lagos
 Lead City University, Ibadan
 Madonna University, Elele
 Michael Okpara University of Agriculture, Umudike
 Modibbo Adama Federal University of Technology, Yola
 Mountain Top University, Ogun State
 Niger Delta University, Wilberforce Island, Bayelsa State
 Nigerian Army University Biu (NAUB)
 Nigerian Defence Academy, Kaduna
 Novena University, Ogume, Delta State
 Obong University, Obong Ntak, Akwa Ibom
 Olabisi Onabanjo University, Ago-Iwoye, Ogun State
 Ondo State University of Science and Technology,  Okitipupa
 Osun State University, Osogbo
 Pan-Atlantic University, Lagos
 Paul University, Awka Anambra
 Precious Cornerstone University
 Renaissance University,  Agbani
 Rhema University,  Aba Abia State
 Ritman University, Ikot Ekpene, Akwa Ibom State
 Rivers State University, Port Harcourt
 Salem University, Lokoja
 Samuel Adegboyega University,  Ogwa Edo State
 Sokoto State University, Sokoto
 Sule Lamido University, Kaffin Hausa, Jigawa State
 Summit University, Offa
 Tai Solarin University of Education, Ijebu-Ode, Ogun State
 University of Abuja, Gwagwalada
 University of Africa (Toru-Orua), Bayelsa State
 University of Agriculture, Makurdi, Makurdi, Benue State
 University of Ilorin, Ilorin
 University of Maiduguri, Maiduguri
 University of Mkar, Mkar-Gboko, Benue State
 Umaru Musa Yar'adua University, Katsina, Katsina State
 University of Uyo, Uyo, Akwa Ibom State
 Usmanu Danfodiyo University, Sokoto, Sokoto State
 Wesley University of Science and Technology, Ondo
 Western Delta University, Oghara, Delta State
 Yusuf Maitama Sule University, Kano
Zamfara State University, Talata Mafara, Zamfara State

See also
List of colleges of education in Nigeria
List of polytechnics in Nigeria

Notes
 - Established in 1853 as a CMS Training Institution in Abeokuta prior to its relocation to Lagos from 1868 to 1896. It was retrospectively established at Oyo in March 1920.

References

External links
 List of private universities in Nigeria at NUC 
 List of state universities in Nigeria at NUC
 List of federal universities in Nigeria at NUC 

Nigeria
 
Universities